Geneva Township may refer to the following places in the United States:

 Geneva Township, Kane County, Illinois
 Geneva Township, Jennings County, Indiana
 Geneva Township, Franklin County, Iowa
 Geneva Township, Allen County, Kansas
 Geneva Township, Midland County, Michigan
 Geneva Township, Van Buren County, Michigan
 Geneva Township, Freeborn County, Minnesota
 Geneva Township, Fillmore County, Nebraska
 Geneva Township, Ashtabula County, Ohio

Township name disambiguation pages